A list of films produced by the Bollywood film industry based in Mumbai in 1920:

1920 in Indian cinema
Manilal Joshi, an eminent Gujarati director, quit his job as a teacher in 1920 and joined Kohinoor Film Company, learning cinematography from Vishnu B. Joshi.
Majority of the silent films made in Indian cinema all over India including the South India states with the exception of Kerala, were mythological in context. The tales were frequently taken from the epic Mahabharata.
Suchet Singh, a silent film director and comparable to Dadasaheb Phalke and S. N. Patankar in the pre-studio era, died in a car crash in 1920. He established the Oriental Film Company in 1919 and directed four films in 1920, Mrichhakatik based on King Shutraka's play of the same name, Rama Or Maya, Doctor Pagal and Narsinh Mehta.
Ardeshir Irani started his first studio, Star Film Company.

Films

References

External links
Bollywood films of 1920 at IMDb

1920
Bollywood
Films, Bollywood